La Couronne, founded in 1345, is the oldest inn in France. It is located in Rouen, capital of the region of Normandy.
It is in the historic city center and the dining room on the 1st floor contains paintings of personalities. In 1948, the restaurant served chef and author Julia Child her first French meal, which was said to inspire her to devote her life to promoting French cooking.

See also 
List of oldest companies

References

External links 
Official site

Restaurants in France
Hotels in France
Companies established in the 14th century
14th-century establishments in France